Salomon Armand Magloire Kalou (born 5 August 1985) is an Ivorian professional footballer who plays as a forward and winger for Djiboutian club Arta/Solar7.

He previously played for Feyenoord from 2003 to 2006 and Chelsea from 2006 to 2012. While at Chelsea, he won numerous honours, including the Premier League, the UEFA Champions League, four FA Cups and the League Cup. Upon the expiry of his contract at Chelsea, he moved on a free transfer in July 2012 to Lille, where he spent two seasons before moving to Hertha BSC for an undisclosed fee. He played 172 games and scored 53 goals in six seasons in the German capital.

A full international for the Ivory Coast since 2007, Kalou amassed 93 international caps and represented his country at two FIFA World Cups, six Africa Cup of Nations tournaments and the 2008 Olympics. He was part of their teams that won the continental title in 2015 and came runners-up in 2012.

Club career

Early career

Kalou was born in Oumé. Like his older brother Bonaventure Kalou, he began his career in local club Mimosas before moving to Europe. He signed for Feyenoord in 2003 and in 2004, he was loaned to Feyenoord's "satellite club", Excelsior.

Kalou then returned to Feyenoord and played in the Dutch top flight Eredivisie for two seasons from 2004 to 2006. During his time with the Rotterdam-based club, he scored 35 goals in 67 league appearances, also winning the Johan Cruijff Award in 2005 as the most promising young talent of the season. Kalou, together with Dirk Kuyt, were affectionately known as "K2" by Feyenoord fans and the Dutch media, a play on the words of K3, a Belgian pop band.

Kalou was linked to several other clubs, including Auxerre, the French team his brother played for.

Chelsea

2006–07 season
Kalou moved to Chelsea on 30 May 2006 for an undisclosed fee, believed to be approximately £9 million. Under contract with Chelsea until 2009, Kalou was handed the number 21 shirt.

Chelsea manager José Mourinho praised the young Ivorian as being hardworking, versatile, eager to improve and unafraid of the physical side of the game. Kalou admitted that he brought a camera with him to his first training session at Chelsea's training centre at Cobham because he could not believe that he was going to be rubbing shoulders with famous footballers like Michael Ballack, John Terry and Didier Drogba. Describing the experience, Kalou said "This was the dream moment of my life and I did not want to wake up and find that it was not real."

At Chelsea, Kalou played with his compatriot and Ivory Coast captain, Didier Drogba. Kalou scored his first goals for Chelsea in a reserve game against Portsmouth, bagging a hat-trick and earning the match ball in a 5–0 thrashing. He scored his first senior goal for Chelsea in a two-goal win over Blackburn Rovers in the third round of the League Cup.

In December 2006 in Chelsea's 3–2 victory over Wigan Athletic at the JJB Stadium, Kalou scored his first Premier League goal, then scored his second league goal against Blackburn in Chelsea's 3–0 win. He also scored a 93rd-minute goal against Watford, putting Chelsea 1–0 up. He also scored a volleyed goal from 12 yards against Tottenham Hotspur in the FA Cup quarter-final, which ended 3–3. Chelsea won the replay 1–2 before progressing to the final with a similar scoreline against Blackburn. Kalou also came on as a substitute in the FA Cup Final win over Manchester United for his second trophy in England, having earlier come on as a substitute for Chelsea in the league Cup Final victory over Arsenal.

2007–08 season

Kalou continued his good form into the season that followed, scoring his first goal of the campaign against Manchester City in Chelsea's 6–0 victory at Stamford Bridge and the opening goal against Derby County in a 2–0 win.

His last minute cross into the penalty area led to John Arne Riise scoring the own goal in the UEFA Champions League semi-final first leg at Anfield, which gave Chelsea a vital away goal over Liverpool. Kalou also scored with Chelsea's sixth penalty in the Champions League final in Moscow, where Chelsea lost to Manchester United.

2008–09 season
Kalou did not feature much under Avram Grant's successor, Luiz Felipe Scolari, except during pre-season, because of his participation in the 2008 Beijing Olympics as part of the Ivory Coast national under-23 football team. However, he came off the bench against Manchester United on 21 September and scored a header after 80 minutes from a Mikel John Obi free kick. The goal ensured that Chelsea secured a point and kept their unbeaten home record. Kalou then scored two goals and assisted a Frank Lampard header on 18 October in Chelsea's 5–0 win at Middlesbrough.

On 14 January 2009, Kalou scored a tap in against Southend United in the third round of the FA Cup as Chelsea ran out 4–1 winners in the replay. Again he scored two goals against Middlesbrough, this time at Stamford Bridge on 28 January, a 2–0 Chelsea win, becoming a favourite under interim manager Guus Hiddink. These strikes proved to be his first goal in 15 Premier League games. He celebrated the goals by making a "handcuff" gesture, but denied he was supporting an Ivorian convictionist. On 25 April 2009, he scored the winner against London rivals West Ham. Kalou was an unused substitute in Chelsea's 2–1 defeat of Everton as the Blues won the FA Cup on 30 May.

2009–10 season
Chelsea beat Manchester United to lift the 2009 FA Community Shield, with Kalou scoring the winning penalty. He scored his first goal of the 2009–10 season against Queens Park Rangers at Stamford Bridge in the third round of the League Cup, earning his team a 1–0 victory. On 12 October 2009, Kalou signed a three-year contract extension with Chelsea, keeping him at the club until the summer of 2012. He celebrated his new contract with an brace against Atlético Madrid in the Champions League, helping Chelsea maintain their perfect record in the competition.

On 24 February 2010, he scored a goal against Internazionale in the Champions League round of 16 first leg. His shot from outside the box was tame but an error from Inter goalkeeper Júlio César allowed the ball to find the back of the net in a 2–1 loss. In Chelsea's 7–0 win over Stoke City on 25 April, Kalou netted a hat-trick, though his second goal of the day had been the source of controversy, as it was very close to being a two-footed tackle. Kalou scored Chelsea's third of eight goals on the last day of the season against Wigan, as the Blues were crowned champions.

2010–11 season

Kalou started the season well with scoring the only goal in the 3–1 defeat at Wembley Stadium against Manchester United. He appeared as a substitute in the 6–0 drubbing of Wigan at the DW Stadium to score two goals, both assisted by fellow Ivorian Didier Drogba.

Through 31 appearances, Kalou had scored 14 goals in all competitions. Despite his form, however, he found it hard to gain a regular first team place since the addition of Fernando Torres from Liverpool in January. Nonetheless, he was included in the starting lineup for their next game against West Bromwich Albion, scoring a goal in Chelsea's 3–1 win on 16 April. Kalou started the next game as well, and scored again as Chelsea defeated Birmingham City 3–1. For Chelsea's crucial game against Tottenham Hotspur, Kalou was not included in the starting lineup, as Carlo Ancelotti preferred a striking partnership of Drogba and Torres. However, Kalou replaced Torres in the 63rd minute, scoring a goal in the 89th minute to lead Chelsea to a 2–1 win and within three points of league leaders Manchester United. This brought him up to ten Premier League goals on the year, the first time he has hit double digit league goals for Chelsea.

2011–12 season
Kalou started the season with Chelsea playing in the club's second league game, against West Brom; he was substituted off, however, after only 34 minutes. He was an unused substitute against Sunderland and Bayer Leverkusen, but he started in Chelsea's first League Cup match of the season against Fulham. Chelsea won 4–3 on penalties, with him converting the second-last penalty. On 28 September 2011, Kalou came on for Frank Lampard in the 83rd minute. He then was booked for handball in the 85th minute which led to Roberto Soldado scoring a penalty; the score ended level at 1–1. Kalou's first goal of the new season came in a 5–0 rout of Belgian side Racing Genk on 19 October 2011. He scored in a 2–1 win at Goodison Park against Everton in the League Cup, then scored his first goal in the Premier League season in a 3–0 away win against Newcastle.

Following the appointment of Roberto Di Matteo as interim manager, Kalou fought his way back into the first-team squad; under André Villas-Boas, he was frozen out, only making four starts in over seven months. Kalou scored his first goal in the season's edition of the FA Cup when Chelsea defeated Leicester City 5–2 at Stamford Bridge. This goal put him alongside Sergio Agüero as the only players to score in the Premier League, League Cup, FA Cup and Champions League in the season. Kalou then netted a vital away goal in the first leg of their Champions League quarter-final clash with Benfica after some great work from strike partner Fernando Torres. Chelsea won the game 1–0. Kalou's goal against Benfica was his 58th for the club. On 29 March 2012, he claimed he had been frozen out by former Chelsea manager André Villas-Boas. On 21 April, Kalou made his 250th appearance for Chelsea in a 0–0 draw away to rivals Arsenal. He started both the 2012 FA Cup Final and Champions League final, both of which were Chelsea victories.

On 1 July 2012, Chelsea officially announced that Kalou's contract had come to an end along with José Bosingwa, after spending six years at the London side. He had made 254 appearances for the club, including 147 starts, and scored 60 goals. After his release, Kalou was linked with numerous clubs across Europe, including the likes of Schalke 04, Liverpool, Galatasaray, Newcastle United and Arsenal.

Lille
On 7 July 2012, it was confirmed that Kalou would sign for Lille on a free transfer after being released by Chelsea at the end of his contract. He was given the number 8 jersey. New manager Rudi Garcia was pleased to see Kalou join Lille, but admitted that it was not easy to convince him to join the French side. Kalou scored his first competitive goal for Lille in his second appearance, a header to equalize the scoreline against Nancy. His first Champions League goal for the club came in their 6–1 defeat to Bayern Munich on 7 November.

In 2013–14, Kalou played all of Lille's games, starting all but two. He scored 16 goals, making him one of five runners-up to Zlatan Ibrahimović for top scorer. This included a hat-trick on 2 March with two penalties, as the Dogues won 3–2 at Ajaccio.

Hertha BSC
On 31 August 2014, Kalou joined Bundesliga side Hertha BSC on a three-year contract. The transfer fee paid to Lille was reported as €3 million.

In his first full season at the Berlin-based club, he played 27 times in the league, scoring six goals and helping Hertha avoid relegation.

At the beginning of the 2015–16 Bundesliga season, Kalou swapped number 11 for the vacant 8 shirt after the departure of Marcel Ndjeng to SC Paderborn. This was the same number he wore during his stint at Lille as well as with the Ivorian national side.

He started the season in good goal scoring form, scoring the winner from the penalty spot in an opening 1–0 win away to FC Augsburg. He scored his second of the season coming on as a substitute against an in-form Borussia Dortmund side in a 3–1 loss. On 3 October, Kalou scored his third goal of the season, the opener in a 3–0 win over Hamburger SV. He scored a brace on 27 October against 2. Bundesliga side FSV Frankfurt in the DFB-Pokal second round in a 2–1 win, scoring the winner from the spot in extra time. His goal-scoring form continued on 6 November when he recorded his first hat-trick for Hertha in a 3–1 win against Hannover 96. Kalou scored the final goal in a convincing 4–0 win over Darmstadt 98 on 12 December, lifting Hertha up to third in the Bundesliga. Kalou scored again the next weekend against Mainz 05, bringing his season tally to nine heading into the Christmas break, explaining that having "time to set up with the team" was important to his success in the first half while setting a goal of reaching the Champions League for his club. With his goal on 30 January 2016 at Werder Bremen, Kalou curiously became the first player to have double-digit goal-scoring seasons in the Premier League, Ligue 1, and the Bundesliga. Maintaining their third place until April, Hertha gained only one point from their final five matches, falling all the way to seventh place. Kalou scored 14 goals in the Bundesliga that year, finishing as Hertha's top scorer.

Kalou played in Hertha's brief Europa League stay against Brøndby IF, as well as their first round Pokal match against Jahn Regensburg, but did not feature in the Bundesliga initially for Pál Dárdai. An injury to Vladimír Darida vacated a spot initially for Valentin Stocker, but when Stocker picked up a three-match ban for a straight red card at Borussia Dortmund, it was Kalou who filled the hole in the attacking midfield, making his season debut on 22 October against FC Köln. On 4 November, Kalou emphatically ended his scoreless start to the season, picking up a hat trick against Borussia Mönchengladbach in a 3–0 victory, moving his side temporarily into third place. On 15 March 2017, Kalou signed a contract extension at Hertha, keeping him at the Olympiastadion until 2019, with Kalou adding "I'm really happy in Berlin and still have a lot to achieve with Hertha. I want to help build on the progress the team has made in recent years."

On 4 May 2020, he streamed live from the Hertha cabin via Facebook. Kalou greeted players and coaches, who were unaware of the live broadcast, with a handshake, disregarded social distancing regulations and filmed a conversation about the Hertha professionals' salary cuts. He was then released from training and playing duties.

Botafogo
On 9 July 2020, Kalou joined Botafogo in the Campeonato Brasileiro Série A on an 18-month contract. He made his debut on 2 September, starting in a goalless home draw against Coritiba. Three days later, he scored in a 2–2 draw at Corinthians. It was his only goal in 27 games across all competitions for the Rio de Janeiro team, who ended the season in last place, 14 points from safety. He left by mutual consent at the start of April 2021.

Arta/Solar7
On 14 June 2022, Kalou joined Arta/Solar7 in the Djibouti Premier League on a short-term contract.

International career

Failure to acquire Dutch citizenship
While at Feyenoord, Kalou sought fast-track naturalisation to become a Dutch citizen and play on the Netherlands national football team. His application was supported by national team manager Marco van Basten, and Dutch football icon Johan Cruyff. The process drew attention as the Dutch were scheduled to play the Ivory Coast at the 2006 FIFA World Cup, and he would likely play against his brother.

His application was rejected in August 2005 by Minister of Immigration Rita Verdonk, who believed that he would soon move to a bigger foreign club. In February 2006 the Council of State ordered that the decision be revised. Verdonk released the same verdict in May, saying that Kalou was ineligible for fast-track naturalisation and would have to go through the same tests as other applicants, thereby ruling Kalou out of the World Cup.

During the process, Dutch insurance company Centraal Beheer made a television advertisement in which Kalou represents the Netherlands' rivals Germany against them. He took legal action for use of his image and name in the film.

Ivory Coast

Kalou's failure to acquire Dutch citizenship was a factor in his decision to leave Feyenoord for Chelsea. He was called up for the Ivory Coast several times in 2006 but rejected them all. His debut game in a 1–0 friendly win over Guinea on 6 February 2007, and on 21 March he scored his first goal in a 3–0 friendly victory against Mauritius.

Kalou was called up for the 2008 Africa Cup of Nations in Ghana. He scored the only goal against Nigeria in the opening game, and added two more in a 5–0 win over Guinea in the quarter-finals as the Elephants came fourth.

At the 2010 Africa Cup of Nations in Angola, Kalou scored the opening goal of a 3–2 extra-time elimination by Algeria in the semi-finals. That June, he went to the 2010 FIFA World Cup in South Africa and scored as a substitute in a 3–0 win over North Korea in the final group game, though the Elephants were eliminated.

On 26 January 2012, Kalou scored a goal in Ivory Coast's 2–0 win over Burkina Faso, helping his side progress into the quarterfinals of the Africa Cup of Nations. In the final, he was substituted after 64 minutes of a penalty shootout loss to Zambia.

Kalou also played at the 2013 Africa Cup of Nations. Later that year, he scored in each leg of a 4–2 win over Senegal in the play-offs for the 2014 FIFA World Cup. In the 2015 Africa Cup of Nations, he came on as a substitute for Siaka Tiéné for the last four minutes of extra time in the final, and scored in a 9–8 shootout win over Ghana.

Personal life
Kalou has two brothers and eight sisters from the same mother. His brother, Bonaventure Kalou, also played professional football. Kalou joined Feyenoord during the time his brother Bonaventure was playing for the club.

In 2010, Kalou set up The Kalou Foundation, dedicated to providing facilities for social welfare and recreation of those who have need of such facilities by reason of youth, age, infirmity or disability, financial hardship or social circumstances and also for the relief of sickness worldwide.

Career statistics

Club

International

International goals
Scores and results list Ivory Coast's goal tally first.

Honours

Chelsea
Premier League: 2009–10
FA Cup: 2006–07, 2008–09, 2009–10, 2011–12
Football League Cup: 2006–07
FA Community Shield: 2009
UEFA Champions League: 2011–12

Ivory Coast
Africa Cup of Nations: 2015

Individual
Johan Cruyff Trophy: 2005
CAF Young Player of the Year: 2008

References

External links

BBC Sport profile 

1985 births
Living people
Footballers from Abidjan
Ivorian footballers
Association football forwards
ASEC Mimosas players
Feyenoord players
Excelsior Rotterdam players
Chelsea F.C. players
Lille OSC players
Hertha BSC players
Botafogo de Futebol e Regatas players
Eredivisie players
Eerste Divisie players
Premier League players
Ligue 1 players
Bundesliga players
Campeonato Brasileiro Série A players
Ivory Coast international footballers
Olympic footballers of Ivory Coast
Footballers at the 2008 Summer Olympics
2008 Africa Cup of Nations players
2010 Africa Cup of Nations players
2010 FIFA World Cup players
2012 Africa Cup of Nations players
2013 Africa Cup of Nations players
2014 FIFA World Cup players
2015 Africa Cup of Nations players
2017 Africa Cup of Nations players
Ivorian expatriate footballers
Ivorian expatriate sportspeople in the Netherlands
Ivorian expatriate sportspeople in England
Ivorian expatriate sportspeople in Germany
Ivorian expatriates in Brazil
Expatriate footballers in the Netherlands
Expatriate footballers in England
Expatriate footballers in France
Expatriate footballers in Germany
Expatriate footballers in Brazil
Africa Cup of Nations-winning players
UEFA Champions League winning players
FA Cup Final players
Djibouti Premier League players
AS Arta/Solar7 players
Expatriate footballers in Djibouti
Ivorian expatriate sportspeople in Djibouti